Shady Hollow is a census-designated place (CDP) in southwestern Travis County, Texas, United States, and is partially in the City of Austin. The population was 5,004 at the 2010 census.

History

In 1978 the homeowners organized the Shady Hollow Homeowners Corporation to counter what they believed was misrepresentation from the developer. The homeowners accused Austin Savings and Loan Owners of installing development more dense than advertised. The two groups formed an agreement, resulting in the creation of parks and recreational facilities along Slaughter Creek; this included the Park on Doe Run. The CDP also received several amenities, including a community center, tennis courts, and a basketball court. In 1984, as per the agreement, Austin Savings and Loan Owners deeded the park and recreational facilities to the Shady Hollow Homeowners Corporation.

Geography

Demographics

As of the census of 2000, there were 5,140 people, 1,658 households, and 1,483 families residing in the CDP. The population density was 957.3 people per square mile (369.6/km2). There were 1,675 housing units at an average density of 311.9/sq mi (120.4/km2). The racial makeup of the CDP was 89.67% White, 2.61% African American, 0.35% Native American, 2.67% Asian, 0.02% Pacific Islander, 3.19% from other races, and 1.50% from two or more races. Hispanic or Latino of any race were 12.92% of the population.

There were 1,658 households, out of which 49.7% had children under the age of 18 living with them, 81.2% were married couples living together, 5.9% had a female householder with no husband present, and 10.5% were non-families. 8.0% of all households were made up of individuals, and 1.7% had someone living alone who was 65 years of age or older. The average household size was 3.06 and the average family size was 3.23.

In the CDP, the population was spread out, with 30.8% under the age of 18, 5.6% from 18 to 24, 27.5% from 25 to 44, 30.5% from 45 to 64, and 5.6% who were 65 years of age or older. The median age was 39 years. For every 100 females, there were 102.8 males. For every 100 females age 18 and over, there were 99.8 males.

The median income for a household in the CDP was $94,470, and the median income for a family was $94,249. Males had a median income of $70,471 versus $37,868 for females. The per capita income for the CDP was $33,532. About 0.5% of families and 1.8% of the population were below the poverty line, including 0.9% of those under age 18 and none of those age 65 or over.

Government and infrastructure
The Manchaca Volunteer Fire Department, headquartered in an unincorporated area of Travis County, provided Shady Hollow with fire protection for many years. As of July 1, 2016 there was an agreement that Austin Fire Dept. would take over the Shady Hollow fire station and provide protection. Travis County Sheriff's Office provides police protection.

Education
Residents are in the Austin Independent School District. Residents are zoned to Baranoff Elementary School in Austin, Bailey Middle School in the Shady Hollow CDP, and Bowie High School in Austin.

Bowie was built in 1988. Bailey was built in 1993. Baranoff was built in 1998.

References

External links
 

Census-designated places in Travis County, Texas
Census-designated places in Texas
Census-designated places in Greater Austin